Elise Thérèse Koekkoek-Daiwaille (May 5, 1814 – June 2, 1881) was a painter and lithographer from the Netherlands.
She was born in Amsterdam and was taught to paint by her father Jean Augustin Daiwaille. She married the landscape painter Barend Cornelis Koekkoek in 1833. They had five daughters, of whom Adèle and Marie Louise also became painters. They ran a school for artists in Kleve, Germany and their former home is now the museum B.C. Koekkoek-Haus. She is principally known for her Principes des fleurs et des fruits, an album with six lithograph's with fruit and flower still lifes.

References
Elise Thérèse Koekkoek-Daiwaille at B.C. Koekkoek-Haus

1814 births
1881 deaths
Dutch lithographers
Dutch women painters
Painters from Amsterdam
19th-century Dutch women artists
19th-century Dutch painters
Women lithographers